The 2000–01 Ukrainian First League was the tenth season of the Ukrainian First League which was won by FC Dynamo-2 Kyiv. The season started on July 23, 2000, and finished on June 28, 2001.

Promotion and relegation

Promoted teams
Three clubs promoted from the 1999-2000 Ukrainian Second League.
Group A
 FC Bukovyna Chernivtsi – champion (returning after a season)
Group B
 FC Borysfen Boryspil – champion (debut)
Group C
 FC Dnipro-2 Dnipropetrovsk – champion (debut)

Relegated teams 
Three clubs were relegated from the 1999-00 Ukrainian Top League:
 FC Prykarpattia Ivano-Frankivsk – 14th place (returning after six seasons)
 FC Chornomorets Odesa – 15th place (returning after a season)
 FC Zirka Kirovohrad – 16th place (returning after five seasons)

Renamed teams
 FC Yavir-Sumy changed its name to FC Spartak Sumy before start of the season.
 On May 25, 2001 FC Volyn Lutsk changed its name to SC Volyn-1 Lutsk.

Teams
In 2000-01 season, the Ukrainian First League consists of the following teams:

Final standings

Top scorers 
Statistics are taken from here.

See also
2000–01 Ukrainian Second League
Ukrainian Premier League 2000-01

References

 The main source

External links 
 Professional Football League of Ukraine - website of the professional football league of Ukraine 

Ukrainian First League seasons
2000–01 in Ukrainian association football leagues
Ukra